Jinx is a fictional supervillain appearing in American books published by DC Comics. Created by Marv Wolfman and Chuck Patton, she first appeared in Tales of the Teen Titans #56 (August 1985). The character is often depicted as a skilled Indian sorceress and one of the leaders of the Fearsome Five, a group of super-villains most notable for being adversaries of the Teen Titans and it's derivaties. This character bears no relation to the male character of the same name who first appeared in Adventure Comics #488 as an adversary of Chris King and Vicki Grant. 

The character has been adapted into other media, including animated films and televisions series, and video games. Her live-action debut is in the fourth season of the HBO Max series Titans, in which she is portrayed by Lisa Ambalavanar.

Publication history
She joined the supervillain group, the Fearsome Five, a frequent enemy of the Teen Titans, Wonder Woman, Superman, and the Outsiders. She has also been a member of Villainy Inc. To date, her real name has not been revealed.

Fictional character biography
Jinx is an Indian elemental sorceress whose powers include the ability to command elements such as air, the manipulation of magical energy that she can manifest as offensive force bolts and green flame, the ability to dissolve matter, and creation of ground tremors. Jinx is bald and slender. She traditionally wears only a white two-piece loincloth bikini with golden jewelry, and she is always barefoot due to the fact that she must be in contact with the ground to use her nature element abilities.

She first encountered the Fearsome Five when that group attacked Tri-State prison where she was incarcerated at the request of Indian authorities. The Five are defeated by the Teen Titans, but Jinx and Neutron decided to join the Fearsome Five. Jinx remained with the group even after Neutron subsequently left it, but after their next appearance in The Adventures of Superman #430 (July 1987), in which they fought Superman alongside new members Deuce and Charger, the group disbanded, and Jinx was incarcerated in the metahuman prison on Alcatraz, along with her teammates Mammoth and Gizmo.

Jinx was part of Circe's army of female supervillains that was defeated by Wonder Woman and Earth's other superheroines. Shortly thereafter, Jinx was recruited by Queen Clea into the re-formed all-female crime organization Villainy Inc. Together with Cyborgirl, Doctor Poison, Giganta, and Trinity, Jinx assists Clea in conquering the other-dimensional land of Skartaris. The plan, however, is commandeered by Trinity. The team has not appeared since.

Later, in a storyline in Outsiders (vol. 3) #12–15 (July–October 2004), frequent Captain Marvel archenemy Dr. Sivana freed Jinx, Mammoth and Gizmo from Alcatraz. Having summoned teammate Psimon and having brought her teammate Shimmer back to life after she had been turned into glass and shattered, Sivana put the team to work for him in a scheme to short sell Lexcorp stock by having them steal its accounts from its corporate building in Metropolis, and then driving down the stock by killing all the people in the building. Sivana also had them destroy two other Lexcorp properties. At the latter of the two, a microchip processor factory of Lexcorp's subsidiary, Kellacor, the Five were confronted by the Outsiders. After escaping, the criminally unsophisticated Five urged Sivana to take Lexcorp's nuclear missile facility near Joshua Tree, California. When Sivana refused, Psimon asserted that they would take it anyway, and in response, Sivana killed Gizmo with a laser blast to the head, and severed relations with the remaining four, warning them that he would kill them if they ever crossed his path again. The Five decided to enact their plan to take the facility and fire a nuclear missile at Canada, but were defeated by the Outsiders. Mammoth was returned to Alcatraz Island, but Jinx and the other members of the Five remain at large.

She was later seen among the new Injustice League, and is one of the villains featured in Salvation Run. She is one of the villains sent to retrieve the Get Out of Hell free card from the Secret Six.

As part of DC Comics' 2011 reboot of its continuity, The New 52, Jinx is a member of the Fearsome Five, which is part of the Secret Society, and allies with The Crime Syndicate. She is sent with the other members of the Fearsome Five, Mammoth, Gizmo, Shimmer and Psimon, along with Doctor Psycho and Hector Hammond to fight against Cyborg and the Metal Men. She ends up defeated by Lead.

In DC's 2016 relaunch of its titles, DC Rebirth, Jinx appears as a member of the Fearsome Five.

Powers and abilities
Jinx is a formidable elemental sorceress who draws her magic from the solid, natural ground. This is why she must have contact between the ground and her bare feet at all times, or else her magical effects become weakened or lost altogether. Her elemental abilities include, but are not limited to: generating powerful force blasts, conjuring wind bursts, summoning emerald flames, creating earth tremors, creating illusions, and even dissolving solid matter. Jinx also has precognitive abilities that allow her to sense dangerous events moments before they occur. Jinx has an ability to converse with the Earth itself, in order to gently manipulate even greater magic stored there. She may have other mystical abilities as well, although none are certain.

Other versions
The animated version of Jinx makes numerous appearances in the comic spin-off of the Teen Titans animated television series, beginning in issue #1. In #26–27, hints are given of Jinx later reforming her criminals ways (much as in the episode "Lightspeed"). In issue #34 she is depicted as Kid Flash's girlfriend. In issue #40, she is still a member of the Hive Five, and issue #43, she aids the Titans in confronting the Fearsome Five. In #53, Jinx' nickname is "Lucky".

In other media

Television

 A variation of Jinx appears in Teen Titans, voiced primarily by Lauren Tom and by Tara Strong in "Titans Together". This version is a teenage student of the H.I.V.E. Academy, later a member of the H.I.V.E. Five, who often works with fellow students Gizmo and Mammoth and possesses probability manipulation instead of sorcery. Additionally, she resembles a witch clad in purple clothing, pale skin, and large pink hair and eyes. Throughout the series, she battles the Teen Titans until an encounter with Kid Flash convinces her to reform.
 Jinx appears in Teen Titans Go!, voiced again by Lauren Tom.
 Jinx appears in the fourth season of Titans, portrayed by Lisa Ambalavanar. This version is a magic-using thief and grifter as well as a contact of Dick Grayson's.

Film
 Jinx makes a non-speaking cameo appearance in Teen Titans Go! To the Movies.
 Jinx makes a non-speaking cameo appearance in DC Super Hero Girls: Legends of Atlantis.

Video games
 Jinx appears as a boss and unlockable character in the 2005 Teen Titans video game.
 Jinx appears as a boss in the 2006 Teen Titans video game.
 Jinx appears in DC Universe Online, voiced by Claire Hamilton. She appears as part of the "Sons of Trigon" DLC.
 Jinx appears as a playable character in Lego DC Super-Villains, voiced again by Lauren Tom.

Miscellaneous
 The Teen Titans animated series incarnation of Jinx appears in Teen Titans Go!. She pretends to return to villainy to infiltrate and undermine the Fearsome Five on the Teen Titans' behalf.
 Jinx appears in DC Super Hero Girls. This version's design is based on the Teen Titans animated series incarnation and appears as a background student of Super Hero High.

References

Characters created by Chuck Patton
Characters created by Marv Wolfman
Comics characters introduced in 1985
DC Comics characters who use magic
DC Comics metahumans
DC Comics female supervillains
DC Comics titles
Fictional characters who can manipulate probability
Fictional characters with elemental and environmental abilities
Fictional characters with energy-manipulation abilities
Fictional characters with air or wind abilities
Fictional characters with earth or stone abilities
Fictional characters with fire or heat abilities
Fictional characters with precognition
Fictional immigrants to the United States
Fictional Indian people